Ali Masjid (Pashto and ) is the narrowest point of the Khyber Pass. It is located in Khyber District of Khyber Pakhtunkhwa, Pakistan. The width of the Khyber near Ali Masjid was earlier too narrow for two fully laden camels to pass each other, but since has been widened.

Name origin
It was named in memory of Ali, the cousin of the Islamic prophet Muhammad. A mosque and a shrine has been built here in the memory of Ali, who visited this place according to a local tradition. There is also a huge boulder which carries the marks of a hand believed to be that of Ali.

History

Ali Masjid is located at the narrowest point in the Khyber Pass. It contains a shrine to ʻAlī ibn Abī Ṭālib (circa 600–661) the cousin and son-in-law of Muhammad. Travellers would stop to pray at the shrine while on the trading route between Kadam and Ali Masjid.
 
The area was originally within Afghanistan, with a fortress built on the height above Ali Masjid in 1837 by the Afghan amir, Dōst Mohammad Khān (1793–1863). The shrine and fort are located in extremely rugged terrain overlooking a deep gorge.

First battle of Ali Masjid

Ali Masjid was the scene of battles during the Anglo-Afghan wars. In 1842 during the First Anglo-Afghan War, the fort was garrisoned by the British. During the disastrous retreat from Kabul, a relief force under Colonel Charles Wild was attacked by Afghan troops of Akbar Khan at the entrance of the Khyber Pass and forced to fall back. The British garrison was forced to evacuate the fort and withdraw to Jamrud.

Second battle of Ali Masjid

In November 1878, during the Second Anglo-Afghan War, the Peshawar Valley Field Force under General Sir Samuel Browne captured the fort from the Afghans under Faiz Muhammad.

In May 1879, the Khyber Pass was ceded to British control by the Treaty of Gandamak, after which the fort was within the British Raj. The British then established their own fort on the site, commanding a strategic view over the Khyber Pass. The fort has a small cemetery which contains the graves of British soldiers who fell in the second Afghan War. The valley walls bear insignias of regiments that have served here.

References

See also
Battle of Ali Masjid, 21 November 1878

Monuments and memorials in Pakistan
Cultural heritage sites in Khyber Pakhtunkhwa